Eide Bailly LLP is a regional certified public accounting and business advisory firm. The firm was founded in Fargo, North Dakota in 1998. Eide Bailly has over 40 offices in 15 different states. The firm has 2,000 employees. Eide Bailly is an independent member of HLB and The Eide Bailly Alliance (formerly known as Practicewise). The Inside Public Accounting Report, ranked the firm as a "Top 25 CPA firm" based on its size in the United States.

History

Early History: Eide Helmeke
 1917: Eide Helmeke debuted in Fargo, North Dakota, as Bishop Brissman & Co., which later changed to J.A. Cull and Co.
 1944: Oliver A. Eide was admitted as a partner and the firm’s name changed to Cull Eide & Co.
 1956: Maynard Helmeke was admitted as a partner and the firm’s name changed to Eide & Helmeke.
 1967-77: After several name changes, the firm began to expand outside the Fargo community. Known as Eide, Helmeke, Boelz & Pasch, the firm acquired offices in Bismarck, North Dakota., in 1968; Sioux Falls, South Dakota, in 1969; and Aberdeen, South Dakota, in 1970.
 1981: Eide, Helmeke, Boelz & Pasch changed its name to Eide Helmeke & Co. and added offices in Phoenix, Arizona, in 1984 and Minneapolis in 1990.

Early History: Charles Bailly
 1950: Charles E. Bailly opened a Broeker Hendrickson office in Fargo.
 1978: Nine partners broke away from Broeker Hendrickson to form Charles Bailly & Co., with offices in Fargo and Bismarck, North Dakota
 1979-90: Charles Bailly & Co. added offices in Sioux Falls, South Dakota, in 1979; Minneapolis, in 1983; Billings, Montana, in 1985; and Dubuque, Iowa, in 1990.

Eide Bailly: Formed
 1998: Eide Helmeke & Co. and Charles Bailly & Co. merged to form Eide Bailly LLP. The combined firm had 56 partners and 392 staff members in nine offices. The total combined revenue was $31 million.
 2004: The firm opened offices in Boise, Idaho, Oklahoma City and Tulsa, Oklahoma.
 2006: The firm added two locations in Madelia and Mankato, Minnesota.
 2007: Eide Bailly celebrated 90 years of service to clients, surpassing, the $100 million mark in total revenue.
 2008: The firm added seven new offices in Boulder, Denver, Frisco, Golden, Grand Junction, and Vail, Colorado and Norman, Oklahoma.
 2012: The firm added two new offices in Ogden and Williston.
 2013: The firm added two new offices in Salt Lake City.
 2014: The firm added six new offices in Spokane, Fort Collins, Elko, Fallon, Las Vegas and Reno.
 2015: The firm added three new offices in Tulsa, Lehi and Scottsdale.
 2017: Eide Bailly celebrated 100 years of service to clients, surpassing the $250 million mark in total revenue. The firm added 6 new offices in Des Moines, Orem, Abilene, Haskell, Plainview and Seymour. 
 2018: The firm added a new office Gooding.
 2019: The firm added eleven new offices in Fresno, Laguna Hills, Palo Alto, Pasadena, Rancho Cucamonga, Sacramento, San Diego, San Mateo, San Ramon and Mumbai.
 2020: The firm added a new office Tustin.
 2021: The firm added two new offices in Bloomington and Plymouth.
 2022: The firm added a new office Omaha.

Service Listing
 Audit & Assurance
 Business Valuation
 Cybersecurity
 Data Analytics
 Employee Benefit & Retirement Plans
 Financial Services
 Fraud & Forensic Advisory
 Health Care Reform
 Human Resources
 International Business Services
 Litigation & Dispute Advisory 
 Outsourced & Managed Services
 Ownership Transition
 Risk Advisory
 Tax
 Technology Consulting
 Transaction Advisory
 Wealth Planning

Industry Listing
 Affordable Housing
 Ag Producers
 Communications & Electric 
 Construction & Real Estate
 Dealerships
 Energy Services
 Financial Institutions
 Gaming
 Government
 Healthcare
 Higher Education
 Insurance
 Manufacturing & Distribution
 Nonprofit

Staff
Eide Bailly has over 2,500 employees. The firm was ranked the 14th best accounting firm in 2017 by Vault.com.

References

External links
 

Business services companies established in 1917
Accounting firms of the United States
1917 establishments in North Dakota
Companies based in Fargo–Moorhead